Events in the year 1989 in the Netherlands.

Incumbents
 Monarch: Beatrix
 Prime Minister: Ruud Lubbers

Events 
 February–March - Beginning of the 1989–1990 Dutch farmers' protests
 6 September – 1989 Dutch general election
 22 October – 1989 De Meer nail bombs

Births

9 January 
Na-Young Jeon, stage actress and singer
Michaëlla Krajicek, tennis player
13 March – Annick Lipman, handball player.
30 March – Denise Kielholtz,  Muay Thai fighter and mixed martial artist
6 April – Elise van Hage, racing cyclist 
9 April – Monique Smit, singer and television presenter
10 April – Rico Verhoeven, kickboxer
2 May – Sallie Harmsen, actress
30 May – Gijs Jorna, volleyball player 
2 June – Darius van Driel, professional golfer 
21 June – Jarno Gmelich, cyclist 
8 July – Rachèl Louise, singer-songwriter
14 July – Patricia van der Vliet, fashion model
15 August – Yannick van de Velde, actor 
16 August – Roeland Pruijssers, chess player.
4 September – Roy Eefting, road and track cyclist 
1 October – Robin van Roosmalen, kickboxer and mixed martial artist 
21 October – Tony Junior, DJ and record producer
9 November – Reinout Scholten van Aschat, actor
11 November – Oedo Kuipers, singer and actor 
16 November – Sanae Orchi, model, entrepreneur, presenter and journalist 
17 November – Gwen van Poorten, presenter
3 December – Bette Franke, model

Full date missing
Emil Landman, folk musician
Yves Rogers, basketball player

Deaths

20 January – Dolf van Kol, footballer (b. 1902)
14 March – Jan de Groote, farmer and politician (b. 1911).
11 May – Johan Schouten, wrestler (b. 1910).
30 September – Liesbeth Ribbius Peletier, socialist feminist politician (b. 1891)
20 October – Jan Stender, swimming coach (b. 1906)
29 November – Ann Burton (Johanna Rafalowicz), jazz singer (b. 1933)

Full date missing
Tom Dissevelt, composer (b. 1921)

References

 
1980s in the Netherlands
Years of the 20th century in the Netherlands
Netherlands
Netherlands